Rostan is a French surname. Notable people with the surname include:

 Georges Rostan (1938–2020), French actor
 Léon Rostan (1790–1866), French doctor
 Marc Rostan (born 1963), French racing driver

See also
Rostagnus, for the given name Rostan

French-language surnames